Carter Bykowski (born July 25, 1990) is a former American football offensive tackle of the National Football League (NFL). He was drafted by the San Francisco 49ers in the seventh round, 246th overall of the 2013 NFL Draft. He played college football at Iowa State.

Early years
Bykowski attended Eden Prairie High School in Eden Prairie, Minnesota, where he was coached by Mike Grant, son of former Minnesota Vikings head coach Bud Grant. He had four catches for 43 yards during his junior season. As a senior, he caught 11 passes for 194 yards and nine touchdowns, helping Eden Prairie win back-to-back Minnesota 5A championships and set Minnesota state championship game records for total yards gained (520), first downs (30), and rushing first downs (22). His squad was 16th-best prep football team according to USA Today Super 25 rankings. In basketball, Bykowski served as team captain as a senior.

Bykowski was the 10th-rated prospect in the state of Minnesota according to Rivals.com, while Scout.com rated him as the 69th tight end nationally.

College career
Signing with Iowa State University in 2008, Bykowski played in three games as a true freshman tight end. The next season, he redshirted while transitioning to offensive tackle. He would further appear in 44 games and make 18 starts at ISU, including starting at left tackle every game of the 2012 season, where he was Honorable Mention All-Big 12. Bykowski majored in management, and was a three-time academic All-Big 12 honoree. After exhausting his eligibility, Bykowski began preparations for the NFL draft.

Professional career

San Francisco 49ers
Bykowski was selected in the seventh round, (246th overall), by the San Francisco 49ers in the 2013 NFL Draft. After spending his rookie season on the practice squad, he signed to a new contract on January 21, 2014.

Minnesota Vikings
The Minnesota Vikings signed Bykowski off the 49ers' practice squad on December 10, 2014. On September 3, 2016, he was released by the Vikings as part of final roster cuts. On September 6, 2016, he was signed to the Vikings' practice squad. On September 13, he was released from the Vikings' practice squad.

Atlanta Falcons
On September 21, 2016, Bykowski was signed to the Falcons' practice squad. He signed a reserve/future contract with the Falcons on February 7, 2017.

On March 30, 2017, Bykowski retired from the NFL when the Falcons placed him on the team's reserve/retired list. He was waived from the list on July 26, 2020.

References

External links
Iowa State Cylones bio
Minnesota Vikings bio

1990 births
Living people
Players of American football from Minnesota
People from Eden Prairie, Minnesota
American football offensive tackles
Iowa State Cyclones football players
Minnesota Vikings players
San Francisco 49ers players
Sportspeople from the Minneapolis–Saint Paul metropolitan area
Atlanta Falcons players